Mormons are people who are members of a religious group that is part of Mormonism and the Latter-Day Saint movement.

Mormon may also refer to:

Religion
 Mormon (word), a follower, or constituent of Mormonism, which is the largest branch of the Latter Day Saint movement
 Mormonism, the religion practiced by Mormons
 The Church of Jesus Christ of Latter-day Saints (LDS Church), also known as the “Mormon Church”, the largest and most prominent branch of the Latter Day Saint movement
 Latter Day Saint movement, a group of faiths, under the theology of Mormonism, tracing their origin to Joseph Smith, Jr.
 Mormon studies, the academic discipline involving scholarship about Mormons
 Mormon fundamentalism, a branch of Mormonism that practices polygamy
 Jack Mormon, slang for an unbaptized Mormon sympathizer or a Mormon member who is not fully devout

Literature
 Book of Mormon, one of the sacred books within the Church of Jesus Christ of Latter-day Saints, and other "mormon-based" religious sects.
Mormon (Book of Mormon prophet), a prophet and narrator figure within the Book of Mormon; the original meaning of the term “Mormon”
Waters of Mormon, fountain of "pure water" where Alma the Elder preaches and baptizes in secret
 Book of Mormon (Mormon's record), one of several "books" within the Book of Mormon
 Words of Mormon, another “book” within the Book of Mormon

Places
 Mormon, California, an unincorporated community in San Joaquin County, California, US

Arts and entertainment
 The Mormons (miniseries), a 2007 PBS documentary about The Church of Jesus Christ of Latter-day Saints

Butterflies
"Mormon" is part of the common name of several butterflies in the genus Papilio, in particular:
 Andaman Mormon (Papilio mayo) found in the Adamans
 Great Mormon (Papilio memnon), endemic to Indochina and Japan
 Blue Mormon (Papilio polymnestor), endemic to parts of India
 Common Mormon (Papilio polytes), endemic to India, the Himalayas, parts of China, and Indochina
 Scarlet Mormon (Papilio rumanzovia), endemic to the Philippines and Celebes

Other uses
 Anabrus simplex, the Mormon cricket
 Sphenophorus mormon, a species of beetle in the family Dryophthoridae
 Mopsus mormon is an Australian spider species of the family Salticidae (jumping spiders)
 inflected form of Mormo (Greek: Μορμώ, Μορμών, Mormō), a female spirit in Greek folklore

See also
 List of sects in the Latter Day Saint movement
Moerman (disambiguation)
Moorman (disambiguation) (also shows entries for “Moormann”)
Morman